Mount Lloyd is a rural locality in the local government area (LGA) of Derwent Valley in the South-east LGA region of Tasmania. The 2016 census recorded a population of 55 for the state suburb of Mount Lloyd.

History 
Mount Lloyd was gazetted as a locality in 1976.

Geography
The Plenty River forms part of the western boundary.

Road infrastructure 
Route C610 (Plenty Valley Road) passes to the north. From there, the Plenty Link and Glenfern Road provide access to the locality.

References

Towns in Tasmania
Localities of Derwent Valley Council